The 2011 Allianz Cup was a professional tennis tournament played on clay courts. It was the 16th edition of the tournament which is part of the 2011 ITF Women's Circuit. It took place in Sofia, Bulgaria between 12 and 18 September 2011.

WTA entrants

Seeds

 1 Rankings are as of August 29, 2011.

Other entrants
The following players received wildcards into the singles main draw:
  Radina Dimitrova
  Hristina Dishkova
  Viktoriya Tomova
  Ani Vangelova

The following players received entry from the qualifying draw:
  Denisa Allertová
  Cristina Mitu
  Ioana Raluca Olaru
  Isabella Shinikova

The following players received entry by a lucky loser spot:
  Vaszilisza Bulgakova

Champions

Singles

 Sílvia Soler Espinosa def.  Romina Oprandi, 2–6, 6–6, ret.

Doubles

 Nina Bratchikova /  Darija Jurak def.  Alexandra Cadanțu /  Ioana Raluca Olaru, 6–4, 7–5

External links
ITF Search 
Official site 

Allianz Cup
Clay court tennis tournaments
Tennis tournaments in Bulgaria
2011 in Bulgarian tennis